Going to Ground is the third book in the Shapeshifter series of young adult novels by Ali Sparkes. It was first published in May 2007.

Plot summary
Following the events of Running the Risk, Dax and the other Colas are sent to recover. However, during this time off, Lisa experiences a vision which warns her that Gideon is in deadly peril. She and Dax attempt to rescue him, only to find that he is not actually in any sort of danger - at least not yet. But strange and unexplainable electrical faults are taking place all over the country, and the government seems to think that Gideon's powers are responsible. Now they will stop at nothing to find him and contain the threat they believe he poses. Gideon, Dax, Lisa, and Mia set off across the country attempting to outwit their pursuers while also trying to find the real cause of these electrical events to clear Gideon's name.

External links
Ali Sparkes' official page on the series

2007 British novels
English fantasy novels
Fiction about shapeshifting
The Shapeshifter
Oxford University Press books